Fox Valley is a village in the Canadian province of Saskatchewan within the Rural Municipality of Fox Valley No. 171 and Census Division No. 8. Fox Valley is located just off Highway 21, approximately 64 kilometres north of Maple Creek and 51 kilometres south of Leader in the southwest region of the province. The early settlers of the village and surrounding area included many Germans from Russia (mainly from the Beresan region near Odessa). The local economy is heavily dependent on agriculture and natural gas.

Fox Valley has a swimming pool, an arena and a curling rink.

History 
Fox Valley incorporated as a village on August 30, 1928.

Demographics 

Education

Fox Valley is home to Fox Valley School (K-12), part of the Chinook School Division No. 211. The school's sports team is the Fox Valley Legends.

See also

List of communities in Saskatchewan
List of villages in Saskatchewan

References

Villages in Saskatchewan
Fox Valley No. 171, Saskatchewan
Division No. 8, Saskatchewan